Clogheen may refer to several places in Ireland :

Clogheen, County Tipperary
Clogheen, County Waterford
Clogheen, County Cork